The Minister–Secretary of State for Finland (in Finnish ministerivaltiosihteeri; in Swedish ministerstatssekreterare) represented interests of the Grand Duchy of Finland in the Imperial Court in Saint Petersburg from 1809 to 1917. Before 1834 the title was secretary of state. The Russian Tsar was represented in Helsinki by the Governor General.

The first secretary of state was Alexander I's Russian advisor Mikhail Speransky. After Speransky (whose term had yet the Committee for Finnish Affairs as another actor in same matters), this State Secretary was required, as were Senators and so forth, to be a subject of the grand duchy.

This secretary of state was an official who, and whose office (there were deputy and assistants) had the monopoly to present Finnish affairs to the Emperor. All acts of the Emperor concerning the grand duchy, were to be countersigned by this State Secretary, or deputized officials. When the Finnish autonomy was establishing, other Finnish-related officials generally supported, and helped to build this monopoly (to mention, Governor-General Alexander Sergeyevich Menshikov was a supporter of this particularism and although he resided in St Petersburg and was in close contact with the emperor as simultaneous Russian Minister of Navy, he consistently had Finnish affairs to go through the Minister State Secretary). The tradition, endorsed by conservative Emperors such as Nicholas I, created a strong precedent. Russian general government was effectively kept out of Finnish affairs, this Minister having the benefit of the channel, and many possibilities to stall Russian ministers. Only in last two decades of the grand duchy, those periods of russification, the system was attempted to be broken in some regards, but it created counteroffensives based on illegality arguments. Vyacheslav von Plehwe's appointment in 1900 was criticized as illegal, because he was not a Finnish citizen. Afterwards, russified Finnish citizens were occasionally used in this office and as members of the senate in Helsinki.

State Secretary

Minister–Secretary of State

Finland's representative

Minister–Secretary of State

References 
 Osmo Jussila, Seppo Hentilä and Jukka Nevakivi. From Grand Duchy to a modern state: a political history of Finland since 1809.

Grand Duchy of Finland
Political history of Finland